Erwin Kostner (born 7 April 1958) is an Italian ice hockey coach and former player. He competed in the men's tournament at the 1984 Winter Olympics.

As a player Kostner won four times the Scudetto: three times with HC Gardena (1975-1976, 1979-1980 and 1980-1981) and one time with HC Bolzano (1989-1990). After retirement he becomes a coach in Italy (with Ritten Sport, HC Gherdëina, SHC Fassa, the jr. team of Val Pusteria and the Under-18 and Under-20 national teams) and Switzerland (Giovani Discatori Turrita Bellinzona and HC Thurgau).

Erwin Kostner is father of figure skater Carolina Kostner and of the ice hockey player Simon Kostner. He is also the uncle of alpine skier Isolde Kostner.

References

External links

1958 births
Living people
Sportspeople from Brixen
Ladin people
Bolzano HC players
HC Gardena players
HC Merano players
Ice hockey players at the 1984 Winter Olympics
Italian ice hockey coaches
Olympic ice hockey players of Italy
Ritten Sport players